Tough Love is the second studio album by English singer Jessie Ware. It was released on 13 October 2014 in the United Kingdom and 24 October 2014 in the United States. The album was supported by the singles "Tough Love", "Say You Love Me", "You & I (Forever)" and "Champagne Kisses".

Background
At the beginning of 2014, Ware returned to the studio to write her second album. Ed Sheeran confirmed in an interview with Daily Star that they had written a song together for the new album. (The song, "Say You Love Me", was released on 13 August 2014.) "Tough Love" is the first single to be taken from the new album, airing for the first time on BBC Radio 1 as "Hottest Record" during the Zane Lowe's show and slated for a UK release on 3 August 2014. "Tough Love" was compared to "Prince at his minimalist '80s best" by Pitchfork, who interviewed Ware prior to the release. "Tough Love" is produced together with BenZel, the production duo composed of London post-bass producer Two Inch Punch and mega-producer Benny Blanco who Ware previously worked with on the single "If You Love Me"; Benzel are also executive producers of her new album. Kid Harpoon, Dave Okumu, Julio Bashmore, Miguel, James Ford, Nineteen85, Sam Smith and Ed Sheeran also worked on the new album.

Singles
"Tough Love", produced by BenZel, was released as the lead single from the album on 23 June 2014. The song peaked to number 34 on the UK Singles Chart, making it her first top 40 single in the UK.

"Say You Love Me" was released as the second single from the album on 28 September 2014 and became her second top 40 hit, charting at number 22.

"You & I (Forever)" was released as the third single from the album. The video for the song was released on 2 December 2014 and was directed by Adam Powell. London-born producer Shift K3Y and Kidnap Kid remixed the track.

On 17 January 2015, Ware confirmed on her Twitter account that the fourth single to be released from the album would be "Champagne Kisses". Chris Sweeney directed the video, which was published on Ware's YouTube account on 11 February 2015.

Critical reception

Upon its release, Tough Love received generally positive reviews from music critics. According to Metacritic, which assigns a weighted average score out of 100 to ratings and reviews from mainstream critics, the album received an average of 74, indicating "generally favorable reviews", based on 26 critics. At AllMusic, Andy Kellman rated the album three stars out of five, claiming that Tough Love has the same "high level of sophistication" as Ware's debut album Devotion, but with "less stimulating results". David Brusie of The A.V. Club graded the album an A−, describing it as a "more than worthy" follow-up to Devotion, while highlighting Ware's strengths as a singer and songwriter. At The Guardian, Caroline Sullivan gave a positive review of the album, calling it "sensual and intriguing", while describing the album's content as a "boneless elegance" with "premium product".

At PopMatters, Colin Fitzgerald rated Tough Love eight discs out of ten, noting that Ware has "gone the correct route", while highlighting the album's pop and R&B sounds of "Kind Of... Sometimes... Maybe" and the minimistical ballad "Keep on Lying".

Track listing

Personnel
Credits for Tough Love adapted from AllMusic.

Benjamin Ash – background vocals
Julio Bashmore – production
BenZel – instrumentation, production, programming
Daniel Butman – violin
Jonny Byers – cello
Gillon Cameron – violin
Mitchum Chin – guitar
Alex Cowper – design
Calina de la Mare – violin
Sam Dew – background vocals
Alison Dods – violin
Mikky Ekko – background vocals
Blake Espy – violin
Glenn Fischbach – cello
James Ford – engineering, keyboards, percussion, production, synthesizer, background vocals
Larry Gold – string arrangements
Vincent Greene – viola
Brendon Harding – engineering, vocal engineering
Emile Haynie – production
Sally Herbert – violin
Lewis Hopkin – mastering, mastering engineer
Devonté Hynes – additional production, guitar
Paul Jefferies – bass, drums, guitar
Jonathan Kim – viola
Rick Koster – violin
Emma Kummrow – violin
Oliver Langford – viola
Jennifer Lee – violin

Andrew Levin – background vocals
Jeremy Levin – background vocals
Lexxx – mixing
Vicky Matthews – cello
Luigi Mazzocchi – violin
Laura Melhuish – violin
Miguel – guitar, background vocals
Nineteen85 – production
Dave Okumu – bass, drum programming, guitar, keyboards, production, programming, synthesizer, background vocals
Phillip A. Peterson – cello, string arrangements
Tom Pigott-Smith – violin
Kate Robinson – violin
Sampha – background vocals
Chris Sclafani – engineering, bass guitar, background vocals
Ed Sheeran – background vocals
Julia Singleton – violin
Bradford H. Smith – assistant engineering
Robert Spriggs – viola
Mark "Spike" Stent – mixing
Geoff Swan – assembly, assistance
Leo Taylor – drums
Annemarieke Van Drimmelen – photography
Matthew Walker – composition
Jessie Ware – composition, vocals
Lucy Wilkins – violin
Aryn Wüthrich – background vocals

Charts

Certifications

Release history

References

2014 albums
Island Records albums
Jessie Ware albums
Albums produced by James Ford (musician)
Albums produced by Emile Haynie
Albums produced by Nineteen85
Albums produced by Two Inch Punch